BMW N47 is a four-cylinder common rail diesel engine that has many improvements over its predecessor, the M47. In 2014 it was replaced with the B47. The USA market never received B47 engine. The only B engine in the US for a diesel was a B57 (6 cyl) in 2018 540d. The newest 4 cylinder diesel in the US was N47TU.

First use
The N47 engine debuted in March 2007 in the facelifted 1 Series BMW E87 and E81 and was available in the 1 Series BMW E82 and E88, which were introduced later in the same year.

Usage in other models
The engine also became available in the 5 Series BMW E60 and E61 from September 2007, several months after the 5 series was face lifted, during which time the older M47 remained available.

In the 2008 model year 3 Series E90/E91/E92/E93 when the entire 3 series range gained the company's Efficient Dynamics technology. Not long after it became available in the X3 and has since then became available in the X1.

1.6 L (97.5 cu in, 1,598 cc, D16)

70 kW version 
The  tune was used in the F20 114d.

85 kW version 
The  tune was used in the F20 116d EfficientDynamics version.

It features the exact same performance figures on paper as the regular 116d (which utilises the D20 in an 85 kW variant) despite the smaller engine size.

2.0 L (121.7 cu in, 1,995 cc, D20)

85 kW version
The  tune is for the entry level E81 and E87 116d, as well as the entry level 3 Series E90 316d. It was also used in the 3 Series F30 316d.

105 kW version
The  model was used in the following:
 E81, E82, E87 and E88 118d
 E90 and E91 318d
 F20 118d
 F30 and F31 318d
 2009-2015 BMW E84 sDrive18d and xDrive18d
 2010–2016 MINI Countryman Cooper SD (R60)
 2010–2014 MINI Cooper SD (R56)
 2010–2015 MINI Cabrio Cooper SD (R57)
 2010–2015 MINI Coupe Cooper SD (R58)
 2012–2015 MINI Roadster Cooper SD (R59)
 2013–2016 MINI Paceman Cooper SD (R61)
 2014–2015 F22 218d
 X3 sDrive18d.

120 kW version
A new   derivative was introduced in September 2009 for the 2010 model year. This version featured exceptionally low  emissions of only  and fuel consumption of 68.9 mpg.

This version was used in the E90 BMW 320d Efficient Dynamics.

130 kW version 
This is found in the
 E81/E82/E87/E88 120d
 E90/E91/E92/E93 320d
 5 Series E60 and E61 520d
 E84 X1 X1 sDrive20d, X1 xDrive20d and E83 X3 xDrive20d.
 2014–2015 F22 220d

In Europe, this particular version is one of the most popular engines in the entire range; the best selling 3 series is the 320d, while the 520d is the UK's best selling 5 series.

Twin power turbo version
In October 2007, BMW introduced a twin sequential turbo model. It uses the same turbo technology first shown in the E60 535d.

The  model was used in the
 E81/E82/E87/E88 123d
 E84 X1 xDrive 23d
 2014–2015 F22 225d

 F20 125d
 F22 225d
 F30 325d
 F32 425d
 F10 525d
 E84 X1 xDrive 25d

Variants

Timing chain problems
The N47 engine family is prone to excessive timing chain wear and premature failure. Rattling noise from the rear of the engine is indicative of the condition. Timing chain failure may call for engine replacement or a costly repair. The most seriously affected units which require the most extensive repairs were produced from 01.03.2007 to 05.01.2009. However, there have been frequent reports of timing chain failure in 1, 3 and 5 series BMW engines manufactured from as early as 2004 until at least 2011 in diesel versions. At times the failure has resulted in a dangerous cut out of the engine while the vehicle was being driven - sometimes at relatively high speed. A "Quality Enhancement" was issued by BMW for some, but not all vehicles, but has since been discontinued.

Other issues

The return spring on the turbo's wastegate was not originally lubricated or covered, this frequently resulted in early failure causing the waste-gate to remain partially or fully open. With the subsequent loss in compression, fuel consumption increased by 30–50%. The problem was described by BMW engineers as a "known fault" and was immediately repaired (BMW mobile engineers even carried boxes of an improved spring), however BMW refused to compensate customers for the excessive fuel consumption and denied this fault was their liability.

As the cars equipped with this engine are coming of age, some hoses in the engine bay can start to break down. This is not to be ignored, even though this does not illuminate the CEL, it just sets a code in the ECU. If the vacuum hose supplying the EGR cooler bypass valve gets a hole rubbed in it, or breaks down from old age and oil spray, the EGR cooler won't get bypassed during the engine warmup period. This causes excessive buildup in the cooler matrix, and when the engine warms up these solid chunks of buildup can detach from the EGR cooler and get sucked into the plastic intake tube, melting holes in the intake tube, causing a massive boost leak and in very rare cases an engine fire. BMW has issued a recall to over 1.6 million vehicles in 2018 for the EGR issues.

References

External links 
 The UnixNerd's BMW N47 engine page  with photos, history and common problems.

N47
Diesel engines by model
Straight-four engines